Tamir Goodman (born January 18, 1982) is a former American-Israeli professional basketball player. He was dubbed by Sports Illustrated magazine as the "Jewish Jordan".

After playing basketball for the Talmudical Academy of Baltimore in 11th grade,  he was ranked 25th-best high school player in the country, with an average of 35.4 points per game. He accepted a scholarship from Towson University.  Goodman then moved to Israel and signed a 3-year contract with Maccabi Tel Aviv in 2002, and was loaned to Giv'at Shmuel for the 2002–03 season, and then played for Elitzur Kiryat Ata in the 2003–04 season, and returned to Giva't Shmuel for the 2005–06 season.

Early life
Goodman grew up in Baltimore, Maryland, in an Orthodox Jewish family with six brothers and two sisters. He began playing basketball at five years of age, but he first garnered national attention as a junior in high school, averaging 35.4 points per game for the Talmudical Academy of Baltimore. In 11th grade, he was ranked the 25th-best high school player in the country, and was dubbed the "Jewish Jordan". Goodman graduated from Takoma Academy of Takoma Park, Maryland, in 2000.

College career 
Goodman received a scholarship offer to the University of Maryland, which had one of the top-ranked basketball teams in the country. The team's schedule included activities on Friday nights and Saturdays (against the rules of Orthodox Judaism). Maryland's coaching staff and Tamir had friction over his refusal to play on the Sabbath, so he declined Maryland's offer. 

Goodman then accepted a scholarship from nearby Towson University. Goodman was the first freshman to start at Towson in eleven seasons. He averaged 6 points, 4 assists, and 2.5 rebounds per game in his freshman year in 2000–2001, and was awarded the coach's award for his performance on the court and in the classroom. Goodman continued at Towson for his sophomore campaign until December 2001, when Goodman filed a complaint that the newly hired coach allegedly assaulted him.

Professional career

Maccabi Tel Aviv B.C. (2002) 
Goodman fulfilled a dream of his by moving to Israel and signing a 3-year contract with Maccabi Tel Aviv on July 22, 2002.

Giv'at Shmuel (2002–2003) 
To get more playing time, Goodman was loaned to Giv'at Shmuel for the 2002–03 season.

Elitzur Kiryat Ata (2003–2004) 
Goodman played for Elitzur Kiryat Ata in the 2003–04 season.

Return to Giv'at (2005–2006) 
Goodman went on to serve in the Israeli Defense Force, a requirement for all Israeli citizens. He suffered a knee injury that required major surgery. After nine months of intensive physical therapy, he beat the odds and returned to Giva't Shmuel to fulfill his contract for the 2005–06 season.

Maccabi Shoham (2006–2007) 
Still recovering from his injury, Goodman dropped down to Liga Leumit to play for Maccabi Shoham. In his first two games, he played more than 20 minutes and scored close to 20 points a game. But in December 2006, Goodman's left knee gave out again and his doctors ordered him to undergo weeks of physical therapy. He did not get to play again until March 2007.

Maryland Nighthawks (2008) 
In late 2007, Goodman moved back to Maryland to play for the Maryland Nighthawks of the newly formed Premier Basketball League (the league began play in January 2008). In his first game, he suffered a complex dislocation of his finger which required surgery and a year of physical therapy.

Maccabi Haifa (2008) 
In July 2008, Goodman signed with Maccabi Haifa. After shattering several bones in his left hand in practice, Goodman was unable to play the remainder of the season.

Bibliography
Tamir Goodman, The Jewish Jordan's Triple Threat

See also
List of select Jewish basketball players

References

External links
"From Jordan to Israel"
Tamir Goodman's website
Update video

1982 births
Living people
American Orthodox Jews
Basketball players from Baltimore
Israeli men's basketball players
Israeli Basketball Premier League players
Israeli Orthodox Jews
Jewish men's basketball players
Elitzur Kiryat Ata players
Maccabi Givat Shmuel players
Maccabi Haifa B.C. players
Towson Tigers men's basketball players
American men's basketball players